Kasakhi Marzik Stadium is a football stadium in Ashtarak, Armenia. It was opened in 1971 and is the former home ground of defunct teams of Mika, Ulisses, Aragats and Kasakh FC. The capacity of the stadium is 3,600. The administrator of the stadium is Armen Matevosyan.

Currently, the stadium is home to the Armenian First League teams of Ararat-2, Shirak-2 and Alashkert-2.

Future developments
In the near future, the venue will be converted into an all-seater stadium and the capacity will be reduced to 2,000 seats.

References

External links
Images of Kasakhi Marzik Stadium at armsport.am

Football venues in Armenia
Multi-purpose stadiums in Armenia
Buildings and structures in Aragatsotn Province
Ashtarak
1971 establishments in Armenia
Sports venues completed in 1971